Kritsana Taiwan (born February 4, 1984) is a professional footballer from Thailand.

Honours
Phitsanulok
 Thai League 3 Northern Region: 2022–23

External links
Thai Premier League Profile

1984 births
Living people
Kritsana Taiwan
Kritsana Taiwan
Association football midfielders
Kritsana Taiwan
Kritsana Taiwan
Kritsana Taiwan
Kritsana Taiwan
Kritsana Taiwan
Kritsana Taiwan
Kritsana Taiwan
Kritsana Taiwan
Kritsana Taiwan